Galin or Gelin or Galyan in Iran may refer to:
 Galin, Kurdistan
 Gelin, Mazandaran
 Galin, Qazvin